ESO Hotel at Cerro Paranal (or Residencia) is the accommodation for Paranal Observatory in Chile since 2002. It is mainly used for the ESO (European Southern Observatory) scientists and engineers who work there on a roster system. It has been called a "boarding house on Mars", because the desert surroundings are Mars-like, and an "Oasis for astronomers".  It is not a commercial hotel, and the public cannot book rooms.

The architect was the Chilean-born Hernán Marchant, a current Professor and Associate Dean at North Carolina State University, the architecture firm was Auer+Weber+Assoziierte of Germany and constructor was Vial y Vives Ltda. of Chile. It won the Cityscape Architectural Review Awards in  2005. In 2004 it won the new and overall Leaf-Awards.

Operated by the European Southern Observatory (ESO), an organization based in Munich, the VLT (Very Large Telescope) is reportedly the most powerful telescope based on Earth.

Location
The people there work in extreme climatic conditions including intense sunlight, dryness, high wind speeds and great fluctuations in temperature. To protect against these an artificial oasis was built to allow respite between shifts.

The total area is 10 000 m², with an L-shape of 176 m × 53 m. It has 4 levels, 1,000 m² of gardens, 108 rooms, and 18 offices. It includes a restaurant, music room, library, swimming pool, and sauna. Its inauguration was in February 2002.

The hotel complex, comprising four levels, fits into an existing depression in the ground. There are views across the desert to the Pacific Ocean from each of the 120 rooms and also from the dining room veranda. Also visible is a slightly raised dome comprising a steel skeleton that measures  in diameter.

In popular culture 
The hotel's exterior was featured in the 2008 Bond film Quantum of Solace, in which the structure was depicted as a fictional eco-hotel in Bolivia. A miniature of the hotel was built by the visual effects team for the shots in which the hotel is destroyed by a fire in the film.

See also
Paranal Observatory
Mars habitat

References
2003 "Auer+Weber+Architekten Arbeiten 1980-2003 Works", Birkhäuser Publishers, Basel

External links

Paranal Observatory
Hotel/Residencia, Inside 
Tour of the hotel filmed by Brady Haran

European Southern Observatory
Buildings and structures in Antofagasta Region
Auer+Weber+Assoziierte
Hotels in Chile